All-Star Baseball is a series of baseball video games that was developed and published by Acclaim Entertainment. The series began in 1997 with the release of All-Star Baseball '97 Featuring Frank Thomas, the successor to Frank Thomas Big Hurt Baseball. New York Yankees play-by-play announcers John Sterling and Michael Kay were the announcers for 1998-2000 editions of the game. The final game in the series is All-Star Baseball 2005. Another game in the series was cancelled, while Acclaim Entertainment ceased operations on September 1, 2004.

Within the individual games, there are several different modes of play, such as exhibition, managing an existing Major League Baseball team or creating a team. Many cities around the world are available for "expansion," in addition to Mexico City and Puerto Rico.

Most of the games feature Derek Jeter on the cover.

Series

1997
The first game in the series featured Frank Thomas and was released for the PlayStation and Sega Saturn.

1999
The game also marked the debut of play-by-play commentary. This is done by two New York Yankees broadcasters: John Sterling and Michael Kay. Larry Walker appeared on the game's box.

2005
All-Star Baseball 2005 features a variety of things that most previous versions (except 2004) did not include, such as classic players like Babe Ruth, Yogi Berra and others. Apart from each of the MLB teams, the game also features MLB legends of different eras and the 2004 American and National league teams. One particular game characteristic is that it includes the Montreal Expos, who relocated from Montreal to Washington D.C. and changed their name to the Washington Nationals for the 2005 MLB season.

The game includes all thirty stadiums as of the 2004 season, as well as other fictional and non-fictional ball parks to bring the total to over eighty parks. Some of these parks include: the Polo Grounds used by the then New York Giants (the New York Yankees played their home games there as well from 1913-1922); Ebbets Field used by the Brooklyn Dodgers from 1913–1957, Houston Astrodome; Hiram Bithorn Stadium used by the Montreal Expos in their final season; retro, current and future versions of Fenway Park, Yankee Stadium, Shea Stadium and Dodger Stadium.

Reception
The Nintendo 64 versions received positive reviews, with an average score in the mid-to-high eighties according to GameRankings. The Gamecube version of All-Star Baseball 2002 received the lowest reviews of all the home console games in the series, with an average score of 67%. All-Star Baseball 2000 on the Game Boy Color has the lowest scores of the entire series, at 60%.

The first game in the series, All-Star Baseball '97 Featuring Frank Thomas, received mediocre reviews upon its release for the PlayStation.

See also
 Triple Play
 MVP Baseball
 MLB 2K
 MLB: The Show

References

External links
All-Star Baseball 2005 at Gamespot.com

Video game franchises
All-Star Baseball video games
Game Boy Color games
Game Boy Advance games
GameCube games
Nintendo 64 games
PlayStation 2 games
Xbox games
Acclaim Entertainment games
Video games developed in the United States